Nicolas Huber (born 14 January 1995) is a Swiss snowboarder. He competed in the 2018 Winter Olympics.

References

1995 births
Living people
Snowboarders at the 2018 Winter Olympics
Snowboarders at the 2022 Winter Olympics
Swiss male snowboarders
Olympic snowboarders of Switzerland
21st-century Swiss people